Griffitts is a surname. Notable people with the surname include:

Hannah Griffitts (1727–1817), American Quaker poet and writer
Samuel Powel Griffitts (1759–1826), American surgeon
Thomas Griffitts (1698–1746), Mayor of Philadelphia and judge

See also
Griffiths